Higher Than Heaven is the upcoming fifth studio album by English singer-songwriter Ellie Goulding, set to be released on 7 April 2023 by Polydor Records. It was preceded by the singles "Easy Lover", "All by Myself", "Let It Die", and "Like a Saviour". It is her first album in three years, since 2020's Brightest Blue.

Background and development 
The album was written in response to the COVID-19 pandemic, according to Goulding: "There was definitely a darkness about [the past two years] that was palpable in the studio, with everyone having gone through it differently. I think for that reason, nobody wanted to sit and agonise over some relationship or some drama. So that’s how this album came together.

Goulding announced a postponement of the album's release on 9 January, from its original release date of 3 February to 24 March. She later announced a second delay to a release date of 7 April.

Track listing

Release history

References 

2023 albums
Albums produced by Greg Kurstin
Ellie Goulding albums
Polydor Records albums
Upcoming albums